Target: Harry (also known as How to Make It and the original title What's in it for Harry?) is a 1969 thriller film directed by Roger Corman.

The film was originally meant as a television pilot for the American Broadcasting Company.  Rather than show it as a made-for-television film, the film was released theatrically as How to Make It.  The film was shot in Monaco and Turkey in 1967 with Monte Hellman editing the film in 1968.

Roger Corman took his name off the film and credited himself as "Henry Neill".

Plot
A person is assassinated at a racing event. Harry Black is let out of prison by Lt Duval.

Cast
 Vic Morrow as Harry Black 
 Suzanne Pleshette as Diane Reed 
 Victor Buono as Mosul Rashi 
 Cesar Romero as Lieutenant Duval
 Stanley Holloway as Jason Carlyle  
 Charlotte Rampling as Ruth Carlyle 
 Michael Ansara as Major Milos Segora 
 Kathy Fraisse as Lisa Boulez
 Christian Barbier as Sulley Boulez 
 Fikret Hakan as Insp. Devrim 
 Milton Reid as Kemal
 Anna Capri as Francesca
 Laurie Main as Simon Sscott
 Victoria Hale as Michele
 Jack Leonard as Valdez

Production
In August 1967 it was announced that Gene Corman would produce What's In It for Harry? on the French Riviera, a "comedy-drama" for ABC from a script by Bob Barbush and directed by Roger Corman. A few weeks later it was announced Vic Morrow would play the star role, and that it would be ABC's initial foray into theatrical motion pictures. Locations would be in Monte Carlo, Greece and Istanbul. Roger Corman later said it was made for TV and called it "a movie of the week before there was such a thing."

Filming began mid September 1967.

Alain Corneau worked as an assistant director.

Reception
Gene Corman reportedly added some nude scenes to help sell the movie under the title of How to Make It. The film was released in England in 1980 as "Target Harry".

See also
 List of American films of 1969

References

External links
 
 Target Harry at Letterbox DVD
 Review of film at DVD Talk

1969 films
American thriller films
1960s thriller films
Films set in Monaco
Films set in Istanbul
Films directed by Roger Corman
Films scored by Les Baxter
Films shot in Monaco
Films shot in Istanbul
1960s English-language films
1960s American films